The Mexico International Short Film Festival - Shorts México - is a film festival exclusively dedicated to short films in Mexico.

Since 2006, it has been held annually during the first week of September in Mexico City, in addition to having a national and international Tour, which takes Mexican short films to venues in Mexico City, other cities in the country and in the world.

It is a festival certified by the Mexican Academy of Cinematographic Arts and Sciences (AMACC). This means that by submitting a short film at this festival, one can register and be considered for the Ariel Award.

The 15th edition of Shorts México (FICMEX) will take place from September 2  to 9, 2020.

The Festival's founder and director is Jorge Magaña and the Director of programming is film curator and producer, Isaac Basulto.

Evolution 
Founded by Jorge Magaña, the first edition took place in 2006 under the name of Shorts Shorts Film Festival Mexico. It was the adaptation of an Asian format, which continues to take place in the city of Tokyo. It was supported by institutions such as the Embassy of Japan in Mexico, Japan Foundation, the Mexican Institute of Cinematography (IMCINE), Cinemex, Televisa Foundation and Telmex Foundation. The venues were: Cinemex WTC, Cinemex Insurgentes, Bella Epoca Cine Lido Cultural Center, Cinematoía Loreto, Pabellón de Alta Tecnología (PAT), the Cineteca Nacional and the University Cultural Center of the UNAM.

As of 2011, the special program of Homenage en Corto was created, in which the works of some actors realized in short films are presented. In that edition, the first actress commemorated was Ana Ofelia Murguía; in 2012, Damián Alcázar; in 2013, Daniel Giménez Cacho; in 2015, the actress Cecilia Suárez; in 2016, Mónica Huarte; in 2017, Vanessa Bauche and in 2018, Arcelia Ramírez. Likewise, in 2013, the Neo Mex Mexican Competition was created to promote new talents in Mexican cinema.

In 2012, it was decided to continue with the Short Film Screenplay Contest, in which the participants submit short film screenplays.

In 2019, the Short Film Pitching Competition was created, in which participants submit short film projects.

Other events of the festival

Noches de Shorts 
Created in 2014 with the purpose of having a place of continuous exhibition for the short film, they are also known as "Noche de Cortoteca". It is an exhibition platform that has the presence of filmmakers, directors, producers, actors, who interact with the audience. They show mainly Mexican short films and a specialized selection of international shorts. This event takes place at the Cineteca Nacional, Fondo de Cultura Económica - Bella Epoca Cine Lido Cultural Center, and now the Comunal Condesa restaurant.

Cortoteca 
Web program dedicated exclusively to diffuse the national and international short films produced by Shorts México and the company Filmmen, presented by the actress Mónica Huarte.

Espacio Shorts México 
Created in 2017, it is the first program dedicated to a film festival, presented by Mexican actress Vanessa Bauche and directed by Rafa Lara, aired on AZ Cinema. The purpose of the program is to show the winning short films of each edition of the festival.

Shorts México Academy 
Series of conferences created and carried out on an academic level with professionals in the fields related to production, postproduction, screenplay, promotion, copyright, etc.

Tour Shorts México 
At the end of its exhibition in Mexico City the festival has a Shorts México Tour throughout the year, which takes place in Mexico City, cities and towns of the Mexican Republic, as well as in various countries. At the national level it has been presented in: Zacatecas, León, Morelia, Fresnillo, Xalapa, Los Cabos, Mérida, Querétaro, Monterrey, Cancun, Oaxaca, Puebla and Saltillo. Internationally, a selection of Mexican shorts have been presented in Tokyo, New York, Cairo, London, Paris, Madrid, Montreal, Santiago and Vancouver.

Awards

References

External links 
 Official website of Shorts México | Festival Internacional de Cortometrajes de México
 Fanpage in Facebook of Shorts México | Festival Internacional de Cortometrajes de México

Short film festivals
Film festivals in Mexico
2006 establishments in Mexico